Matt Lucena (born August 4, 1969) is a former professional tennis player from the United States. He won the mixed doubles title at the 1995 US Open.

College years
Lucena played tennis for UC Berkeley from 1988 to 1992. He and Doug Eisenman were NCAA doubles champions in 1990 and with a new partner, Bent-Ove Pedersen in 1991, Lucena went back to back. A three-time All-American, he didn't drop a set in either year.

Professional career
The highlight of Lucena's professional career was winning the 1995 US Open mixed doubles title, partnering Meredith McGrath. Unseeded, the pair had never played together previously. He twice made the quarter-finals of the men's doubles at the US Open, in 1991 with his UC Berkeley teammate Pedersen and in 1993 with Brian MacPhie. He won one ATP Tour doubles title, at St. Poelten in 1995, as well as four ATP Challenger titles.

Grand Slam finals

Mixed doubles: 1 (0–1)

ATP Tour career finals

Doubles: 2 (1–1)

Challenger titles

Doubles: (4)

References

External links
 
 

1969 births
Living people
American male tennis players
US Open (tennis) champions
Grand Slam (tennis) champions in mixed doubles
California Golden Bears men's tennis players
Tennis people from California